Elmira is an unincorporated community in Bonner County, in the U.S. state of Idaho.

History
A post office called Elmira was established in 1892, and remained in operation until 1954. The community served miners on a pack-horse route.

Elmira's population was 50 in 1909, and was estimated at 20 in 1960.

References

Unincorporated communities in Bonner County, Idaho
Unincorporated communities in Idaho